Prva Hercegovačka is a Bosnian commercial cable television channel. The channel is intended for audience in Herzegovina region, although it broadcast from headquarters located in the Brčko, Bosnia and Herzegovina. This television channel mainly broadcasts Croatian music and the program is produced in Croatian. The channel is available via cable systems throughout the Bosnia and Herzegovina.

References

External links 
 Valentino BiH
 Communications Regulatory Agency of Bosnia and Herzegovina

Mass media in Brčko District
Television stations in Bosnia and Herzegovina